Vanport Mosaic Festival is an annual summer festival begun in 2016 commemorating the history of Vanport, Oregon's then second-largest city, which was destroyed by the 1948 Columbia River flood, and the Fair Housing Act. It is described by its organizers as an act of "memory activism".

See also 
History of Portland, Oregon
Kaiser Shipyards
Interstate 405 (Oregon)

References

 
 
 
 </ref>
 

Festivals established in 2016
Festivals in Portland, Oregon
History festivals